An HTML Application (HTA) is a Microsoft Windows program whose source code consists of HTML, Dynamic HTML, and one or more scripting languages supported by Internet Explorer, such as VBScript or JScript. The HTML is used to generate the user interface, and the scripting language is used for the program logic. An HTA executes without the constraints of the internet browser security model; in fact, it executes as a "fully trusted" application.

The usual file extension of an HTA is .hta.

The ability to execute HTAs was introduced to Microsoft Windows in 1999, along with the release of Microsoft Internet Explorer 5. On December 9, 2003, this technology was patented.

Uses 
HTAs give the developer the features of HTML together with the advantages of scripting languages. They are popular with Microsoft system administrators who use them for system administration from prototypes to "full-scale" applications, especially where flexibility and speed of development are critical.

Environment

Execution

An HTA is executed using the program mshta.exe, or, alternatively, double-clicking on the file. This program is typically installed along with Internet Explorer. mshta.exe executes the HTA by instantiating the Internet Explorer rendering engine (mshtml) as well as any required language engines (such as vbscript.dll).

An HTA is treated like any executable file with extension .exe. When executed via mshta.exe (or if the file icon is double-clicked), it runs immediately. When executed remotely via the browser, the user is asked once, before the HTA is downloaded, whether or not to save or run the application; if saved, it can simply be run on demand after that.

By default, HTAs are rendered as per "standards-mode content in IE7 Standards mode and quirks mode content in IE5 (Quirks) mode", but this can be altered using X-UA-Compatible headers.

HTAs are dependent on the Trident (MSHTML) browser engine, used by Internet Explorer, but are not dependent on the Internet Explorer application itself. If a user removes Internet Explorer from Windows, via the Control Panel, the MSHTML engine remains and HTAs continue to work. HTAs continue to work in Windows 11 as well.

HTAs are fully supported running in modes equivalent to Internet Explorer versions 5 to 9. Further versions, such as 10 and 11, still support HTAs though with some minor features turned off.

Security considerations

When a regular HTML file is executed, the execution is confined to the security model of the web browser. This means it is confined to communicating with the server, manipulating the page's object model (usually to validate forms and/or create interesting visual effects) and reading or writing cookies.

On the other hand, an HTA runs as a fully trusted application and therefore has more privileges than a normal HTML file; for example, an HTA can create, edit and remove files and registry entries. Although HTAs run in this 'trusted' environment, querying Active Directory can be subject to Internet Explorer Zone logic and associated error messages.

Development
To customize the appearance of an HTA, an optional tag hta:application was introduced to the HEAD section. This tag exposes a set of attributes that enable control of border style, the program icon, etc., and provide information such as the argument (command line) used to launch the HTA. Otherwise, an HTA has the same format as an HTML page.

Any text editor can be used to create an HTA. Editors with special features for developing HTML applications may be obtained from Microsoft or from third-party sources.

An existing HTML file (with file extension .htm or .html, for example) can be changed to an HTA by simply changing the extension to .hta.

Vulnerabilities
HTA have been used to deliver malware. One particular HTA, named 4chan.hta (detected by antiviruses as JS/Chafpin.gen), was widely distributed by the users of the imageboard as a steganographic image in which the user were instructed to download the picture as an HTA file, which when executed, would cause the computer to automatically spam the website (evading 4chan's CAPTCHA in the process) with alternate variants of itself; it was reported that such attacks were previously delivered in which the user was prompted to save it as a .js file.

Example
This is an example of Hello World as an HTML Application.

<HTML>
<HEAD>
<HTA:APPLICATION ID="HelloExample" 
   BORDER="bold" 
   BORDERSTYLE="complex"/>
<TITLE>HTA - Hello World</TITLE>
</HEAD>
<BODY>
<H2>HTA - Hello World</H2>
</BODY>
</HTML>

See also 
Adobe AIR
Active Scripting
Apache Cordova
Chromium Embedded Framework
Electron (software framework)
Firefox OS
React Native
XAML Browser Applications (XBAPs)
XUL and XULRunner - a language and environment for Mozilla cross-platform applications that resembles the mechanism of HTML Applications.
Windows Script Host

References

External links
 HTML Component (HTC) Reference at MSDN. An HTC encapsulates specific functionality or behavior within HTAs.
 The Script Center, The Script Center, home of Hey, Scripting Guy! Blog
 Learn About Scripting for HTML Applications (HTAs), a tutorial site for learning about HTA's

HTML
Internet Explorer
User interface markup languages
Widget engines